Christopher Andrew Valaika (born August 14, 1985) is an American former professional baseball infielder and current coach who is the hitting coach for the Cleveland Guardians of Major League Baseball (MLB). He played in Major League Baseball (MLB) for the Cincinnati Reds, Miami Marlins and Chicago Cubs. He was formerly an assistant hitting coach for the Cubs.

Before professional baseball
Born to father Jeffrey Valaika and mother Ilona, Chris Valaika is the oldest son of 5 children. He is an American of Lithuanian descent. Valaika attended Hart High School in Santa Clarita, CA, and also attended college at the University of California-Santa Barbara. He was a member of the U.S. National Team, and won the silver medal at the U-18 Pan Am Cup in Curacao-Antilles and the gold medal at the 2004 World University Baseball Championship in Taiwan.

Professional baseball

Cincinnati Reds
The Cincinnati Reds drafted Valaika in the third round of the 2006 First-Year Player Draft, and he started his pro career with the rookie class Billings Mustangs. Chris hit .324 with 22 doubles and eight home runs with the Mustangs, and led the Pioneer League in total bases (143)and hits (89); was second in runs scored (58), RBI (60), and games played (70); and third in extra-base hits (34) and at-bats (275). He compiled a Pioneer League record 32-game hit streak, longest in the Minor Leagues in 2006.

Valaika started 2007 with the low A Dayton Dragons, where he had two 11-game hit streaks. He was Reds' Minor League player of the month for April. His play earned him the starting shortstop for the East Division in the Midwest League All-Star game, as well as a spot on the ML's postseason All-Star team. He was promoted to high-A Sarasota on July 4, where he batted .253 with two home runs and 23 RBI in 57 games.

Valaika spent 2008 with Sarasota and the Class AA Chattanooga Lookouts. In a combined 129 games, he batted .317 with 18 HR, 82 RBI, and nine stolen bases. He led all Reds minor leaguers in average and was second in RBI. His performance once again earned him Reds' Minor League player of the month for April. He played for the U.S. in the 2008 All-Star Futures Game, and was a mid-season Florida State League All-Star. He had an 18-game hit streak, which was second longest in the Southern League. Valaika received the Chief Bender Award for Reds' Minor League Player of the Year in 2008.

He played for the Peoria Javelinas in the Arizona Fall League, where he batted .311 with two doubles, a triple, seven home runs, and 16 RBI in 32 games.

On November 20, 2009 the Reds added Valaika to their 40-man roster to avoid the Rule 5 Draft.

Valaika made his Major League debut on August 24, 2010.  In his first career at-bat, Valaika got his first Major League hit - a single off of Santiago Casilla - on the first pitch he saw.

Valaika was also called up for a brief stint with the Reds in 2011 to fill in for the injured Scott Rolen.

Miami Marlins
In 2013, Valaika was one of several Miami Marlins players verbally assaulted by hitting coach Tino Martinez, resulting in Martinez's resignation. When the organization considered promoting Valaika to the majors in August when Plácido Polanco was placed on the disabled list, Marlins' owner Jeffrey Loria, who had handpicked Martinez, vetoed the transaction; the team promoted Gil Velasquez instead. With the New Orleans Zephyrs, he hit .235, with 7 doubles, 4 homers, 15 RBIs, and 1 stolen base. Before his wrist injury, he played 1st base, 2nd base, 3rd base, and shortstop for the Marlins. He hit .219, with 5 doubles, 1 homer, 9 RBIs, and no stolen bases when he was up with the Marlins.

He became a free agent on October 1, 2013.

Chicago Cubs
On November 17, 2013, Valaika agreed to a minor-league deal with an invitation to Spring Training with the Chicago Cubs. Valaika would add depth to third base along with minor-league invitee Mat Gamel.

On August 1, 2014, Valaika was called up to the Cubs in the wake of the team trading Emilio Bonifacio and James Russell to the Atlanta Braves. On August 20, 2014, Valaika hit his first home run as a member of the Chicago Cubs. After the season, he was outrighted off the roster. He re-signed with the Cubs after the season.

Personal
Valaika's younger brother, Pat Valaika, played for the Colorado Rockies and Baltimore Orioles.

References

External links

1985 births
Living people
Cincinnati Reds players
Miami Marlins players
Chicago Cubs players
UC Santa Barbara Gauchos baseball players
Billings Mustangs players
Sarasota Reds players
Dayton Dragons players
Chattanooga Lookouts players
Louisville Bats players
Arizona League Reds players
North Shore Honu players
Peoria Javelinas players
Jupiter Hammerheads players
New Orleans Zephyrs players
Iowa Cubs players